Malus hupehensis, common names Chinese crab apple, Hupeh crab or tea crabapple, is a species of flowering plant in the apple genus Malus of the family Rosaceae.

It is native to China.

Description

It has pink buds, opening to fragrant white blossoms in spring. It produces bright red, cherry-sized crab-apples in the autumn.

Etymology
Malus is the ancient Latin name for apple trees.

Hupehensis means 'from Hubei province, China'. 'Hubei' was formerly spelled 'Hupeh' or 'Hupei' in English.

Uses
The plant is cultivated as an ornamental tree, for planting in gardens. It has gained the Royal Horticultural Society's Award of Garden Merit.

References

External links
line drawing, Flora of China Illustrations vol. 9, fig. 77, 12-15 

hupehensis
Crabapples
Endemic flora of China
Plants described in 1910
Data deficient plants
Taxonomy articles created by Polbot